Judy Tzu-Chun Wu is an activist, historian, and Asian American Studies Professor at the University of California, Irvine, where she also serves as the director of the Humanities program. She taught at Ohio State University from 1998-2015 and the University of Chicago from 2005-2006. She received her Phd in U.S. History from Stanford University in 1998. Her main areas of research include U.S. History, Asian Americans, women, immigration, gender, and sexuality. Currently, she is researching the Asian American women who attended the 1977 National Women’s Conference.

Biography
Aside from teaching, she has been involved in a variety of educational/activist efforts such as speaking on C-SPAN, participating on the National Women's History Museum's Speaker Bureau, advocating for Asian American and Pacific Islander education at Stanford University through SAPAAC (Strengthening Asian American Studies at Stanford), working as an advisor for The Beginnings of Activism for the Department of Asian American Studies (BADAAS) at the University of California Irvine, writing for Time Magazine writing for Ms. (magazine), and editing for Amerasia Journal.

Judy Tzu-Chun Wu also contributes to a variety of activist based projects and organizational efforts. She serves as faculty director of the Stories by the Sea Project, a collaboratory project between the UCI Humanities Center, the Newport Beach Library Foundation, UCI Center for storytelling, UCI Libraries, and the UCI History Department. This project pushes students to examine how the vastness of the sea can bridge the gaps between the past, present, and future. She is also a research lead for the Learning From Our AAPI Leaders Project at UC Irvine and a project lead for the Visualizing Our Identities and Cultures for Empowerment Project (VOICE). She is one of the Faculty Principal Investigators/Mentors for the #EmpireSuffrageSyllabus project, a collaboration between faculty at the University of California and the Women and Social Movements journal and database published by Alexander Street/ProQuest that contains a comprehensive collection of modules and resources with the purpose of rethinking U.S. Women's Suffrage. She is also a project lead for Sharing Comfort and Care at UC Irvine, a project dedicated to representing intergenerational connections using migration and food. This project tells the story of two underrepresented groups within the AAPI community, Cambodians and Native Hawaiians/Pacific Islanders

Career

Books 
Judy Tzu-Chun Wu has authored, co-authored, and edited many academic publications:

Dr. Mom Chung of the Fair-Haired Bastards: A Life of a Wartime Celebrity (2005) 

Radicals on the Road: Internationalism, Orientalism, and Feminism during the Vietnam Era (2013) 

Fierce and Fearless: Patsy Takemoto Mink, First Woman of Color in Congress

Podcasts 
Why I became a professor of Asian American Studies: “The Takeover: May 15, 1989,” A Digital Narrative, May–April 2009 

My personal story and political take on immigration:“A Trip Down Immigration Lane,” A Digital Narrative, October 2010

Films 
Margaret Chung- First American Born Chinese Doctor (1889-1959)

Awards 
“Democratizing Politics: Mapping the Stories and Significance of the 1977 National Women’s Conference,” Subrecipient, National Endowment for the Humanities Collaborative Research Grant (2022)

Dynamic Womxn of UCI, Tamara Austin Legacy Award, University of California, Irvine (2021)

Rising Together, Thriving Together Conference, Outstanding Faculty Mentorship Award, DREAM Center, University of California, Irvine (2021)

Leading and Learning Initiative Stories of Change Case Study, Co-Principal Investigator, Imagining America: Artists + Scholars in Public Life, Davis, California (2021)

Chancellor’s Award for Excellence in Undergraduate Research Mentorship, Recipient for the School of Humanities, Division of Undergraduate Education, University of California, Irvine (2020-2021)

Chancellor’s Award for Excellence in Fostering Undergraduate Research, School of Humanities and University of California, Irvine, Undergraduate Research Opportunities Program (2019)

The CCC Faculty/Staff Ally Award, University of California, Irvine, The Cross-Cultural Center (2018)

References 

American historians
Year of birth missing (living people)
Living people
University of California, Irvine faculty